Universal state may refer to
Universal state (Toynbee), as used in reference to A Study of History, a work by historian Toynbee.
Universal state (Turing), a concept in the study of computational complexity